The Embassy of the Kyrgyz Republic in Moscow is the chief diplomatic mission of Kyrgyzstan in the Russian Federation. It is located at 64 Bolshaya Ordynka Street in the Yakimanka District of Moscow.

See also 
 Kyrgyzstan–Russia relations
 Diplomatic missions in Russia

References

External links 
  Embassy of Kyrgyzstan in Moscow

Kyrgyzstan–Russia relations
Kyrgyzstan
Moscow